Erdinç is a Turkish given name for males and a surname. People named Erdinç include:

Given name 
 Erdinç Balto (born 1991), Turkish basketball player
 Erdinç Güler (born 1983), Turkish Canadian Businessman 
 Erdinç Kebapçı (born 1993), Turkish trap shooter
 Erdinç Saçan (born 1979), Dutch politician of Turkish descent
 Erdinç Tekir (born 1966), Abkhaz-Turkish hijacker
 Erdinç Türksever (born 1985), Turkish alpine skier
 Erdinç Yavuz (born 1978), Turkish footballer

Surname 
 Erol Erdinç (born 1945), Turkish classical pianist and conductor
 Mehmet Şükrü Erdinç (born 1976), Turkish politician 
 Mevlüt Erdinç (born 1987), Franco-Turkish footballer
 Şeyhmus Erdinç (born 1992), Turkish amputee footballer

Turkish-language surnames
Turkish masculine given names